Farquhar is a surname of Scottish origin. Farquhar may also refer to:

Places
 Cape Farquhar, Western Australia
Farquhar Cattle Ranch, an Alabama Department of Corrections state prison for men, located south of the town of Greensboro in unincorporated Hale County, Alabama.
Farquhar Street, George Town, Penang, Malaysia
Farquhar Group, a group of islands that are part of the Seychelles
Farquhar Atoll, an atoll within the Farquhar Group
Farquhar Glacier, a glacier in NW Greenland

Ships
USS Farquhar (DE-139), an Edsall-class destroyer escort built for the U.S. Navy during World War II
USS Farquhar (DD-304), a Clemson-class destroyer built for the United States Navy during World War I

See also
Farquhar baronets, three baronetcies created for members of the Farquhar, Farquhar Baronetcy, of Cadogan House in the County of Middlesex, Townsend-Farquhar Baronetcy, of Mauritius and Farquhar Baronetcy, of Cavendish Square in the parish of St Marylebone in the County of London
Farquhar-Hill rifle, a British design by Moubray G. Farquhar and Arthur H. Hill, was one of the first semi-automatic rifles designed in the early 20th century